In Mandaeism, a shkinta or shkina (škina) is a celestial dwelling inhabited by uthras in the World of Light that is analogous to the shekhinah in Jewish mysticism. In Tibil (the physical earth), it refers to a reed hut that is used during Mandaean priest initiation ceremonies, since Mandaean priests represent uthras on earth.

Ceremonial usage

During the priest initiation ceremony, the shkinta is constructed to the north of the andiruna. It symbolizes the World of Light and it covered by a white cloth roof. In contrast, the andiruna has a blue cloth roof to symbolize the color of Ruha. Together, the two adjacent huts symbolize complementary masculine and feminine elements.

Symbolism
The škinta (cognate with the Hebrew word shekhinah; from the Semitic root š-k-n, associated with dwellings) symbolizes the "male" side, and is associated with the World of Light, priests, the right side, gold, and the taga (crown).

In contrast, the andiruna symbolizes the "female" side, and is associated with the earth (Tibil), laypeople, the left side, silver, and the klila (myrtle wreath). Similarly, in a traditional Persian house, the women's quarters are known as andirūn.

See also
 Andiruna
 Shekhinah
 Sweat lodge in Native American spiritual ceremonies
 Tarmida

References

Mandaean buildings
Mandaic words and phrases
Religious buildings and structures
Mandaean cosmology
Mandaean given names